Ficus ramiflora is a species of fig tree in the family Moraceae.

The tree is endemic to the Amazon region of Brazil, in the states of Acre, Amapá, Amazonas, and Roraima.

It is an IUCN Red List Endangered species.

References

Sources

ramiflora
Endemic flora of Brazil
Flora of the Amazon
Flora of Roraima
Environment of Acre (state)
Environment of Amazonas (Brazilian state)
Flora of Amapá
Trees of Brazil
Plants described in 1984
Endangered flora of South America
Taxonomy articles created by Polbot